Oliva tigridella is a species of sea snail, a marine gastropod mollusk in the family Olividae, the olives.

Description
The length of the shell varies between 15 mm and 42 mm.

Distribution
This marine species occurs from the Philippines and Indonesia to French Polynesia and Australia.

References

External links
 

tigridella
Gastropods described in 1835